Pasuppara is a small village near Elappara in Idukki district of Kerala state, India. It is about 12 km from Elappara, 12 km from Vagamon and 9 km from Kottamala. The factory of AVT Tea Plantations is situated in Pasuppara. There is a small river that flows eastward from the village and joins Periyar (river) near Elappara.

References

External links 
 Wikimapia views - Pasuppara estate

Villages in Idukki district